The New Jimmy Reed Album is an album by blues musician Jimmy Reed released by the BluesWay label in 1967.

Reception

AllMusic reviewer Stephen Thomas Erlewine stated the album was: "bogged down by a production that tries to move Reed into the blues-rock era. Consequently, the album is primarily of interest to completists, since even hardcore Reed fans may find the production disconcerting".

Track listing
All compositions credited to Jimmy Reed except where noted
 "Big Boss Man" (Luther Dixon, Al Smith) – 2:43
 "I Wanna Know" (Johnnie Mae Smith) – 2:48
 "Got Nowhere to Go" (Jimmy Reed, Al Smith) – 2:30
 "Two Ways to Skin a Cat" (Al Smith) – 2:35
 "Heartaches and Trouble" – 2:15
 "Baby What You Want Me to Do" – 2:20
 "Honey I'll Make Two" (Johnnie Mae Smith) – 2:18
 "You Don't Have to Go" – 3:14
 "Don't Play Me Cheap" (Al Smith) – 2:20
 "Two Sides to Every Story" (Al Smith) – 2:30
 "I'm Just Trying to Cop a Plea" (Mary Lee Reed) – 2:30
 "Two Heads Better Than One" (Al Smith) – 3:15

Personnel
Jimmy Reed – guitar, vocals, harmonica
William "Lefty" Bates – guitar
Jimmy Gresham – bass
Al Duncan – drums

References

Jimmy Reed albums
1967 albums
BluesWay Records albums